Fine Line Features (often spelled as FineLine Features) was the specialty films division of New Line Cinema. From 1991 to 2005, under founder and president Ira Deutchman, Fine Line acquired, distributed and marketed films of a more "indie" flavor than its parent company, including such critically acclaimed films as Hoop Dreams, The Player, Short Cuts, Night on Earth, Spanking the Monkey, Shine, My Own Private Idaho, Hedwig and the Angry Inch and Mrs. Parker and the Vicious Circle. In 2005, New Line teamed up with fellow Time Warner subsidiary HBO to form Picturehouse, a new specialty film label into which Fine Line was folded into.

Fine Line Features DVD releases were split between HBO Video and New Line Home Entertainment. When New Line Home Entertainment ceased to exist in 2010, it was folded into Warner Home Video (now Warner Bros. Home Entertainment).

Selected films released

1990s

2000s

References 

New Line Cinema
Defunct film and television production companies of the United States
American companies established in 1991
Mass media companies established in 1991
Mass media companies disestablished in 2005
Film production companies of the United States